Michael Whittaker (April 1918 - 1995) was a British costume designer and actor.

He was nominated at the 23rd Academy Awards for his work on the film The Black Rose. This was in the category of  Best Costumes-Color.

Filmography

As actor

The Avengers (1942)
Flying Fortress (1942)
In Which We Serve (1942)
Read All About It (1945) (short film)

As costume designer

The Black Rose (1950)
The Naked Heart (1950)
Flesh & Blood (1951)
Lilli Marlene (1951)
The Story of Robin Hood and His Merrie Men (1952)
The Men of Sherwood Forest (1954)

He also worked on the British TV show The Avengers.

References

External links

British costume designers
1918 births
Year of death missing